Awasthi Bala Prasad is an Indian politician and a member of the 16th Legislative Assembly in India. He represented the Mohammdi constituency of Uttar Pradesh and is a member of the Bhartiya Janta Party political party.

Early life and education
Awasthi Bala Prasad was born in Lakhimpur Kheri district. He attended the University of Lucknow and attained Bachelor of Laws degree.

Political career
Awasthi Bala Prasad has been a MLA for three terms. He represented the Mohammdi constituency and is a member of the Bharatiya Janata Party political party. Prasad was earlier a member of the Bahujan Samaj Party.

Posts held

See also
 Dhaurahra (Assembly constituency)
 Mohammdi (Assembly constituency)
 Sixteenth Legislative Assembly of Uttar Pradesh
 Uttar Pradesh Legislative Assembly

References 

1950 births
Bahujan Samaj Party politicians from Uttar Pradesh
Living people
People from Lakhimpur Kheri district
Uttar Pradesh MLAs 1991–1993
Uttar Pradesh MLAs 2007–2012
Uttar Pradesh MLAs 2012–2017
Uttar Pradesh MLAs 2017–2022
Bharatiya Janata Party politicians from Uttar Pradesh